Island Creek may refer to:

Island Creek (Talbot County, Maryland)
Island Creek (Trent River tributary), a stream in Jones County, North Carolina
Island Creek (West Virginia), a stream
Island Creek Pond, a lake in Massachusetts 
Island Creek Township, Jefferson County, Ohio